Esquermes  is a former commune in the Nord department in northern France, since 1858 part of Lille.

Heraldry

See also
Communes of the Nord department

Lille
Former communes of Nord (French department)